Czarnkowski (feminine: Czarnkowska; plural: Czarnkowscy) is a Polish surname. Notable people with this surname include:

 Adam Sędziwój Czarnkowski (1555–1628), Polish nobleman
 Kazimierz Franciszek Czarnkowski (died 1656), Polish nobleman
 Zofia Czarnkowska Opalińska (1660–1701), Polish noblewoman

See also 
 

Polish-language surnames